Cavallerleone is a comune (municipality) in the Province of Cuneo in the Italian region Piedmont, located about  south of Turin and about  north of Cuneo.

Cavallerleone borders the following municipalities: Cavallermaggiore, Murello, Racconigi, and Ruffia.

References

Cities and towns in Piedmont